Eupithecia pretansata is a moth in the family Geometridae. It is found in Arizona (the Huachuca Mountains) and Chihuahua in Mexico.

References

Moths described in 1908
pretansata
Moths of North America